Brou Kouakou (born 1948) is an Ivorian athlete. He competed in the men's long jump at the 1976 Summer Olympics.

References

External links
 

1948 births
Living people
Athletes (track and field) at the 1976 Summer Olympics
Ivorian male long jumpers
Olympic athletes of Ivory Coast
Place of birth missing (living people)